Margarita Sidorenko (Russian: Маргарита Сидоренко, born 17 January 1988) is a Russian Paralympic archer. She won a gold medal in the mixed team recurve event at the 2020 Summer Paralympics, together with Kirill Smirnov, and placed ninth individually. She won three silver medals in the team recurve at the 2015–2017 world championships.

Sidorenko has a degree in accounting from the Krasnoyarsk State Institute of Trade and Economics. She became disabled after a traffic accident that damaged her spinal cord. She took up archery in 2012.

References

External links 
 

1988 births
Living people
Russian female archers
Paralympic archers of Russia
Paralympic medalists in archery
Paralympic gold medalists for the Russian Paralympic Committee athletes
Archers at the 2016 Summer Paralympics
Archers at the 2020 Summer Paralympics
Medalists at the 2020 Summer Paralympics
20th-century Russian women
21st-century Russian women